Daemaar Group is a UAE based conglomerate group of companies currently operating in Construction for Civil, MEP, Facility Management, trading and retail. It is headquartered in Abu Dhabi, UAE.  It was founded in 1992 by Mohammed Jafer Musthafa. Other areas they are currently functional are GCC countries Qatar, Kuwait, Oman,  Saudi Arabia, Bahrain and India. In 2015, Daemaar group acquired SPELCO-MEP. Recently they acquired MJM contracting, company that operates with public and private establishments in Sharjah and Dubai.

References 

Conglomerate companies of the United Arab Emirates
Companies based in Abu Dhabi
Multinational companies headquartered in the United Arab Emirates